Lawton High School (LHS) was the first high school built in Lawton, Oklahoma. Lawton High is located at 601 Northwest Fort Sill Boulevard in Lawton, Oklahoma. The school was originally housed in a building on 800 Southwest 'C' Avenue, which later came to be the Central Junior High building until the junior high was also moved to 1201 Northwest Fort Sill Boulevard. The current Lawton High School was built in 1954.

Athletics championships 

Oklahoma 6A
 Football: 2014 Runner Up, 2016 Runner Up
Oklahoma 5A
 Football: 1987
 Wrestling: 1989, 1992, 1993
 Wrestling: National Champions 1993 
Oklahoma 4A
 Football: 1970
 Boys Track: 1974, 1976
 110 Hurdles State Meet Record: 1980
Oklahoma 2A
 Baseball: 1959, 1962, 1964, 1965
 Boys Basketball: 1962
 Football: 1962, 1963
 Boys Track: 1960, 1961, 1962
Oklahoma A
 Boys Tennis
 Singles: 1966
 Girls Tennis: 1958, 1959, 1962
 Doubles: 1958, 1959, 1960, 1961, 1962, 1963, 1966
 Singles: 1959, 1962
Oklahoma Class 1
 Girls Basketball: 1928
 Girls Golf: 1939

Notable alumni
John Bateman – various Major League Baseball clubs
Randy Bass – various Major League Baseball clubs and Hanshin Tigers of Japanese Baseball
Don Blanding - American poet, graduated in 1912
John Paul Brammer – advice columnist / writer
Dewell Brewer – NFL player
C. J. Cherryh – Award-winning science fiction novelist
Ginny Creveling – activist and charity organizer
Darryl Gardner – NFL Miami Dolphins
Weldon Gentry – American football player / coach
Eddie Hinton – Baltimore Colts
Stacey King – Chicago Bulls
Mike Minter – Carolina Panthers (player) / Campbell University (head coach)
Rico Noel – Professional baseball player
Antonio Perkins – Americal college football player
Will Shields – Kansas City Chiefs
Ray Gene Smith – NFL player
Kelly Stinnett – various Major League Baseball clubs
Tony Sumpter – American football player
James Trapp – NFL Player (Baltimore Ravens, Oakland Raiders)
Hank Walbrick – American football coach

Footnotes

External links
 Official Lawton High School Website
 Lawton Public Schools

Public high schools in Oklahoma
Lawton, Oklahoma
Educational institutions established in 1901
Schools in Comanche County, Oklahoma
1901 establishments in Oklahoma Territory